Beaver Creek is a  long 4th order tributary to the New Hope River in North Carolina.  Beaver Creek joins the New Hope River within the B. Everett Jordan Lake Reservoir.

Course
Beaver Creek rises in a pond on the Crabtree Creek divide in Apex in Wake County, North Carolina.  Beaver Creek then flows west to meet New Hope River in the B. Everett Jordan Lake Reservoir in Chatham County.

Watershed
Beaver Creek drains  of area, receives about 47.1 in/year of precipitation, has a topographic wetness index of 468.29, and had an average water temperature of 15.31 °C.  The watershed is 19% developed, 1.4% agricultural, 52% forested, and 6.2% open water.

References

Rivers of North Carolina
Rivers of Chatham County, North Carolina
Rivers of Wake County, North Carolina